

Va 
Vašarovići

Ve 
Vedro Polje, Velika Kladuša, Veliki Ograđenik, Veluša, Velja Međa (municipality Ravno), Veljaci, Vesela

Vi 
Vihovići (municipality Mostar), Vileši, Vinište, Vinjani, Vionica, Vir, Visoko, Vitez, Vitina, Vitkovići, Višići

Vl 
Vinine (municipality Neum) Vlahovići, Vlajčići, Vlaka (municipality Ravno)

Vo 
Vojnići, Vojno (municipality Mostar)

Vr 
Vraneši, Vranići, Vranpotok, Vranjevići (municipality Mostar), Vrapčići (municipality Mostar), Vrbanja, Vrbica, Vrbljani, Vrci, Vrdi (municipality Mostar), Vrdolje, Vremci, Vrpeć, Vrpolje

Vu 
Vučetići, Vučipolje, Vučipolje, Vukovići (municipality Ravno)

Lists of settlements in the Federation of Bosnia and Herzegovina (A-Ž)